Ferdinand Spichiger (born 1909) was a Swiss footballer who played for FC Basel in the mid 1930s. He played as midfielder. 

Spichiger joined Basel's first team in 1934. After one test game against FC Liestal, Spichiger played his domestic league debut for the club in the home game at the Landhof on 15 September 1934 as Basel won 3–0 against Locarno. He scored his first goal for his club on 30 September 1934 in the home game also at the Landhof against FC Bern. It was the first goal of the game and Basel won 3–1.

Between the years 1934 and 1937 Spichiger played a total of 19 games for Basel scoring a total of three goals. 12 of these games were in the Nationalliga, two games in the Swiss Cup and five were friendly games. He scored all three of his goals in the domestic league.

References

Sources
 Rotblau: Jahrbuch Saison 2017/2018. Publisher: FC Basel Marketing AG. 
 Die ersten 125 Jahre. Publisher: Josef Zindel im Friedrich Reinhardt Verlag, Basel. 
 Verein "Basler Fussballarchiv" Homepage

FC Basel players
Swiss men's footballers
Association football midfielders
1909 births
Year of death missing